Beyond Fear is a British television crime dramatisation, first broadcast on 30 March 1997, the opening night of Channel 5, that details the kidnap of estate agent Stephanie Slater by convicted murderer Michael Sams. The drama was adapted from Slater's acclaimed book of the same name by screenwriter Don Shaw, with Jenny Wilkes assigned to direct. Beyond Fear starred Gina McKee as Slater and Sylvester McCoy as Sams, with Judith Anthony, Kitty McGeever, Sally Rogers and Iain Rogerson also appearing in key roles.

Gerard Gilbert of The Independent gave praise to Beyond Fear, writing: "The undoubted jewel in Channel 5's rather wobbly opening-night crown. This is a fine, unsalacious reconstruction of Slater's brave cat-and-mouse encounter with her captor, and Gina McKee gives a convincing portrayal of a normal young woman in an intolerable situation. Former Doctor Who alumni Sylvester McCoy is gruffly menacing as Sams." 1.7 million viewers tuned it for the drama's debut broadcast. Notably, Beyond Fear has never been released on VHS or DVD, although has previously been repeated on True Entertainment as part of their Best of British season.

Cast
 Gina McKee as Stephanie Slater
 Sylvester McCoy as Michael Sams
 Judith Anthony as Betty Slater
 Kitty McGeever as Jo Fennimore 
 Sally Rogers as DS Anne Woolley
 Iain Rogerson as DS Steve McBride
 Phil Croft as Derek Smith
 James Grant as Warren Slater
 Roger Ennals as P.C. Simpson
 Davyd Harries	as Det. Supt. Morris
 Bob Mason as Det. Supt. Clarke
 Di Sherlock as Mrs. Dart
 Bruce Alexander as Interrogator #1
 Terence Beesley as Interrogator #2

References

External links

British television films
English-language television shows